This is a list of Japanese  and finger foods. It includes both brand name and generic snacks.

Types

Anko, or sweet bean paste
Anko is a kind of sweet bean paste.
Anko is mainly eaten during the afternoon green tea time in Japan.　School students eat it after school, at home.

Botamochi
Daifuku
 - Daifuku with strawberry
Dorayaki
Manjū
Monaka
Imagawayaki
Kusa mochi
Taiyaki
Yōkan

Bean
Beans with salt are mainly taken with beer in the evening.
Edamame
 Soramame - boiled broad bean
  - fried broad bean

Bread/Wheat Flour
generic
Karintō – deep-fried brown sugar snack
Monjayaki
Okonomiyaki
Takoyaki

brand
Hello Panda
Kappa Ebisen
Koala's March
Pocky – known as Mikado in Europe
Pretz
Yan Yan

Candy
generic
Amezaiku - Japanese candy craft artistry

Konpeitō
 - compressed tablet candy

brand
Botan/Tomoe Ame
Calpis Candy
 – made by Meiji Confectionery in Japan
Cubyrop
gumi 100
Hi-chew

Pinky

Puré gumi candy - gummy candy with fruit purée made by KANRO Co., Ltd.

Cake
Tokyo Banana

Chewing gum
Black Black
Fuwarinka
Kiss Mint and Watering Kissmint
Let's
 Plus X
Poscam
Pure White
Sweetie
whatta – chewing gum by Meiji Confectionery
Xylish
Yuzu

Corn
 Curl (Japanese snack)
 Kyabetsu Taro

Chocolate
generic
Matcha chocolate - chocolate containing matcha

brand
 - chocolate in shape of Apollo command module

Crunky kids

E-Royce'
Every Burger

Kinoko no yama - known as CHOCOROOMS in US
Koara no māchi
Ghana
Pocky – known as Mikado in Europe
Pucca Chocolate
 - known as CHOCOCONES in US
Toppo

Ice cream & shaved ice
generic
Green tea ice cream
Kakigōri
Mochi ice cream

brand
, manufactured by Morinaga & Company.
Panapp
Yukimi Daifuku

Potato
generic
 Ishiyakiimo　- roasted sweet potato
Kenpi

brand
Bōkun Habanero
Jagarico, manufactured by Calbee.
Kara Mucho and Suppa Mucho
Kataage Potato
, manufactured by Morinaga & Company.
 - wasabi & beef flavoured potato chips
 - potato snack in shape of seafood.

Rice
generic
Onigiri, or rice ball can be eaten both as a snack and as a meal, by modern Japanese people. In Sengoku period, samurai ate large rice balls as a field ration during the war.

Agemochi
Arare
Botamochi
Daifuku
Dango
Kaki no tane

Kusa mochi
Mochi
Senbei

brand
Bakauke
Olive no Hana
Onigiri senbei

Seafood
Big Katsu
Ebi senbei
Gyoniku soseji, a surimi fish sausage
Miyako Konbu
 Surume
Yotchan Ika

Street foods

Dorayaki
Korokke
Nikuman
Ōbanyaki
Taiyaki
Takoyaki
Yakitori

Mixed and other
Ajigonomi
Don Tacos

Producers

Calbee
Glico
Kameda Seika
Koikeya
Kuriyama Beika
Lotte
Meiji
Morinaga
Tohato
Yamayoshi

See also

 Japanese instant noodles
 List of Japanese dishes
 List of snack foods by country
 Snacking
 Wagashi
 Sakana

References

External links
 

List
Snack food
Japanese snacks